Umaru Sanda Amadu is a Ghanaian media personality and broadcast journalist on Citi FM and Citi TV conglomerate. He anchors on news bulletins including Eyewitness News on radio and CitiNewsroom on TV. He also hosts the weekly FaceToFace personality-driven discussion show on Citi TV. Umaru Sanda is known in the media fraternity as the 'cowboy journalist'; taking inspiration from his days as herdsman before joining the media profession. He is the youngest of seven children three brothers and four sisters who did not have formal education.

Education 
Umaru Sanda Amadu completed his basic education at the Asutsuare Junction D/A Basic School located in the Shai Osudoku District then Dangme West of the Greater Accra Region. Upon graduating in 2003, he was awarded a district scholarship to pursue high school education at Tema Secondary School.

He then proceeded to the Ghana Institute of Journalism for a diploma in communication studies (2008–2010) after completing Tema Secondary School in 2006. Umaru later furthered his study again with Ghana Institute of Journalism (GIJ) where he obtained a Bachelor of Arts Communications [Journalism option] in a top-up program between 2012 and 2014.

Career 

Umaru Sanda started journalism as an intern in the newsrooms of Ashiaman-based Sena Radio and Accra-based TV3. In 2010 he joined Citi FM as a national service personnel where he has served in various roles producer of Eyewitness News, Citi Breakfast Show, Citi Prime News, and the weekend news analysis show The Big Issue, which he later served as an anchor.

The 'cowboy journalist' also wrote for the now defunct The Globe newspaper which was owned by the same organization, as well as its online portal citifmonline.com and citinewsroom.com.

He anchors major news bulletins including Eyewitness News on radio and CitiNewsroom on TV. He also anchors the weekly personality-driven discussion show FaceToFace on Citi TV.

Personal life 
Umaru Sanda Amadu is married with two children.

Awards 
 He has several awards to his name listed below:

References 

Living people
Ghanaian television journalists
21st-century Ghanaian writers
Ghanaian radio journalists
Ghana Institute of Journalism alumni
1987 births